For information on all Texas A&M–Corpus Christi sports, see Texas A&M–Corpus Christi Islanders

The Texas A&M–Corpus Christi Islanders women's basketball team is the women's basketball team that represents Texas A&M University–Corpus Christi in Corpus Christi, Texas. The team currently competes in the Southland Conference. The Islanders are currently coached by Royce Chadwick.  The team plays its home games at the American Bank Center and the on–campus Dugan Wellness Center.

Roster

Year by year results
Conference tournament winners noted with # Source

References

External links